Simmons is an English patronymic surname. Notable people with the surname include:

Artists
 Edward Simmons (painter) (1852–1931), American Impressionist painter
 Don Simmons (artist), Canadian experimental artist and writer
 Philip Simmons (1912–2009), American artisan and blacksmith

Athletes
 Al Simmons (1902–1956), American baseball player
 Andrelton Simmons (born 1989), Curaçaoan baseball player
 Andrew Simmons (born 1984), British wrestler
 Anthony Simmons (American football) (born 1976), American football player
 Ben Simmons (born 1996), Australian basketballer
 Bob Simmons (American football coach) (born 1948), American football coach
 Bobby Simmons (born 1980), American basketball player
 Brian Simmons  (born 1975), American football player
 Brian Simmons (baseball) (born 1973), American baseball player
 Cedric Simmons (born 1976), American basketball player
 Charles Simmons (gymnast) (1885–1945), British gymnast (competed in the 1912 Summer Olympics)
 Chippy Simmons (1878–1937), English footballer
 Coralie Simmons (born 1977), American water polo player
 Craig Simmons (born 1982), Australian cricketer
 Curt Simmons (1929-2022), American baseball player
 David Simmons (rugby league) (born 1984), Australian rugby league player
 Don Simmons (ice hockey) (1931–2010), Canadian ice hockey player
 Elliot Simmons (born 1998), English footballer
 Grant Simmons (basketball) (born 1943), American basketball player
 Grant Simmons (footballer) (born 1952), Australian rules footballer
 Hi Simmons (1905–1995), American college baseball coach
 Isaiah Simmons (born 1998), American football player
 James Simmons (footballer), English footballer
 Jason Simmons (born 1976), American football player
 Jeffery Simmons (born 1997), American football player
 Jim Simmons (American football) (1903–1977), American football player
 Joe Simmons (1895–1973), American college sports coach
 Jordan Simmons (born 1994), American football player
 Lachavious Simmons (born 1996), American football player
 Lendl Simmons (born 1985), Trinidadian cricketer
 Lionel Simmons (born 1968), American basketball player
 Lloyd Simmons, American baseball coach
 Louie Simmons, American powerlifter
 Mark Simmons (American football) (born 1984), American football player
 Mark Simmons (boxer) (born 1974), Canadian heavyweight boxer
 Mark Simmons (cricketer) (born 1955), English cricketer
 Paris Simmons (born 1990), English footballer
 Phil Simmons (born 1963), Trinidadian cricketer
 Richard Simmons (born 1948), American fitness trainer and actor
 Robert Wilson Simmons (1919–1954), American surfer
 Ron Simmons (born 1958), American professional wrestler and football player
 Roy Simmons (1956–2014), American football player
 Royce Simmons (born 1960), Australian rugby league player and coach
 Stephen Simmons (footballer) (born 1982), Scottish footballer
 Ted Simmons (born 1949), American baseball player
 Tony Simmons (athlete) (born 1948), British athlete
 Tony Simmons (gridiron football) (born 1974), American football player

Businesspeople
 Harold Simmons (born 1938), American business magnate
 John Simmons (clothing manufacturer) (1796–1870), clothing manufacturer
 Matthew Simmons (1943–2010), American investment banker, author
 Russell Simmons, (born 1957) American business magnate
 Sydney Simmons (1840–1924), British entrepreneur and philanthropist
 Zalmon G. Simmons (1828–1910), American business magnate, founder of Simmons Bedding Company, and politician

Criminals
 Gemase Lee Simmons, (born 1976) American convicted and sentenced con-man and sex offender
 Ronald Gene Simmons (1940–1990), American spree killer and family annihilator
 Eddie Bissel-Simmons (born 2003), Vaccinated

Educators
 Beth A. Simmons (born 1958), American academic and notable international relations scholar
 Donald C. Simmons, Jr. (born 1964), American educator, author, historian and public servant
 George F. Simmons (1925–2019), American mathematician
 Ruth J. Simmons, 18th president of Brown University
 William J. Simmons (teacher) (1849–1890), African-American academic; eponymous second president of Simmons College of Kentucky

Entertainers

In acting
 Ashley Simmons (born 1986), American wrestler (best known as Madison Rayne)
 Chelan Simmons (born 1982), Canadian actress
 Henry Simmons (born 1970), African-American actor
 J. K. Simmons (born 1955), American actor
 Jaason Simmons (born 1970), Australian actor
 Jason and Kristopher Simmons, American identical twins
 Jean Simmons (1929–2010), British-American actress
Johnny Simmons (born 1986), American actor
 Lili Simmons (born 1993), American actress
 Richard Simmons (actor) (1913–2003), American actor
 Shadia Simmons (born 1986), Canadian actress

In music
 Alice Carter Simmons (1883–1943), American pianist, organist, and music educator
 Daryon Simmons (born 1995), American hip-hop dancer, rapper, and choreographer (best known as DLow)
 Diggy Simmons (born 1995), American rapper and son of Joseph Simmons
 Earl Simmons (1970–2021), birth name of DMX, American rapper and actor
 Gene Simmons (born 1949), professional name of American rock musician Gene Klein 
 Jeff Simmons (musician) (born 1949), American rock musician
 Joseph Simmons (born 1964), American hip-hop musician
 Joseph Simmons (guitarist), American guitarist
 Jumpin' Gene Simmons (1933–2006), American rockabilly musician
 Little Mack Simmons (1933–2000), American blues harmonica player, singer, and songwriter
 Nicholas Alexander Simmons (born 1999), American rapper known professionally as YBN Nahmir
 Norman Simmons (musician) (1929–2021), American jazz musician
 Paul Simmons, American rock drummer
 Sonny Simmons (1933–2021), American jazz musician

In film and television
 Anthony Simmons (writer) (1922–2016), British writer and director
 Barry Simmons (born 1948), British quiz show participant
 Bob Simmons (stunt man) (1933–1988), British stunt man
 Julian Simmons (born 1952), Northern Ireland television presenter
 Milton T. Simmons (born 1948), fitness personality and actor, best known as Richard Simmons
 Sue Simmons (born 1943), American news anchor

Fashion
 Kimora Lee Simmons (born 1975, as Kimora Lee Perkins), American fashion model and designer
 Vanessa Simmons (born 1983), American fashion model and actress (daughter of Joseph Simmons)

Historical figures
 Michael Simmons, 19th century American pioneer

Politicians
 Barbara Lett-Simmons (1927–2012), American politician
 Charles Simmons (politician), British Lord of the Treasury and later Parliamentary Secretary to the Minister for Pensions
 David Simmons (Australian politician), Australian politician
 Furnifold McLendel Simmons, American politician
 James Aubrey Simmons, Canadian politician and notary
 James F. Simmons, United States politician from Rhode Island
 James S. Simmons, United States politician from New York
 Lindsay Simmons, Australian politician
 Lydia Simmons, British politician
 Rob Simmons (born 1943), American politician
 Robert G. Simmons (1891–1969), American politician
 Ron Simmons (Texas politician) (born 1960), American politician 
 Rouse Simmons (Wisconsin politician), (1832–1897), American politician and businessman
 William Simmons (politician) (1865–1908), Canadian politician
 W. T. Simmons, American politician from Texas

Scientists
 Edward E. Simmons (1911–2004), American electrical engineer and inventor of the bonded wire resistance strain gauge
 George H. Simmons (1852–1937), editor-in-chief of the Journal of the American Medical Association and general secretary of the American Medical Association
 Gustavus Simmons (born 1930), American cryptographer
 Howard Ensign Simmons, Jr. (1929–1997) American chemist who discovered the Simmons–Smith reaction
 Michelle Simmons (1967), Australian physicist
 Norman Simmons (1915–2004), Nobel Prize winner and pioneer in DNA research

Soldiers
 Robert John Simmons (circa 1837-1863) a Bermudian soldier who served in the British Army and 54th Massachusetts Infantry Regiment, mortally wounded at the Second Battle of Fort Wagner.

Writers and journalists
 Adelma Simmons (1903–1997), American author and herbalist
 Allan Simmons (born 1957), British scrabble player and author
 Bill Simmons (born 1969), American sportswriter and author
 Charles Simmons (author) (1924–2017), American editor and novelist
 Christopher Simmons, American designer, author
 Dan Simmons (born 1948), American writer
 Diane Simmons, American writer
 James Simmons (poet) (1933–2001), Irish poet, literary critic and songwriter
 Matty Simmons, American newspaper reporter
 Michael L. Simmons (1896–1980), American screenwriter 
 Rachel Simmons (born 1974), American author
 Steve Simmons, Canadian sports journalist
 William Mark Simmons (born 1953), American author

Other
 Edwin H. Simmons, United States Marine Corps Brigadier General and Marine Corps historian
 James B. Simmons (clergyman), recording secretary for American Baptist Home Mission Society
Lintorn Simmons (1821–1903)
 Shraga Simmons, American rabbi
 William Joseph Simmons (1880–1945), founder of second Ku Klux Klan in the United States
Lorenzo Simmons (Born 1967) American Blogger

Fictional characters
 Simmons (Red vs. Blue), a character in the machinima production Red vs. Blue
 Chanel Simmons, a character in The Cheetah Girls
 Derek C. Simmons, a character in  Resident Evil
 Diane Simmons, a character in Family Guy
 Frank Simmons (Stargate), a character in Stargate
 Jemma Simmons from Marvel's Agents of S.H.I.E.L.D.
 Mabel "Madea" Simmons, a character portrayed by Tyler Perry
 Matt Simmons, a protagonist of Criminal Minds and Beyond Borders
 Mindy Simmons, a character played by Michelle Pfeiffer in an episode of The Simpsons
Mr. Robert Simmons, fictional character from the Nickelodeon animated series Hey Arnold!
 Thag Simmons, a caveman from Gary Larson's comic The Far Side
 Walter Simmons, a character on CSI: Miami
 Albert Francis "Al" Simmons AKA Spawn, fictional superhero comic book character

See also
 Simmonds
 Simonds (disambiguation)
 Simons
 Symonds (disambiguation)

Surnames from given names
English-language surnames
Patronymic surnames